Ichera Peak, Sentinel Range 
 Ichev Nunatak, Bastien Range 
 Iglika Passage, Livingston Island  
 Mount Ignatiev, Trinity Peninsula
 Igralishte Peak, Alexander Island  
 Ihtiman Hook, Livingston Island  
 Ilarion Ridge, Greenwich Island  
 Ilchev Buttress, Graham Coast
 Iliev Glacier, Alexander Island  
 Ilinden Peak, Greenwich Island
 Ilyo Point, Clarence Island
 Imelin Island, Trinity Island  
 Imeon Range, Smith Island  
 Intuition Peak, Livingston Island  
 Ioannes Paulus II Peninsula, Livingston Island  
 Irakli Peak, Trinity Peninsula  
 Iratais Point, Desolation Island  
 Irnik Point, Snow Island  
 Isbul Point, Livingston Island
 Ishirkov Crag, Oscar II Coast  
 Iskar Glacier, Livingston Island
 Iskra Peak, Oscar II Coast 
 Istros Bay, Clarence Island
 Ivan Alexander Point, Nelson Island  
 Ivan Asen Cove, Smith Island
 Ivan Asen Point, Smith Island  
 Ivan Vladislav Point, Rugged Island 
 Ivanili Heights, Oscar II Coast 
 Ivanov Beach, Livingston Island
 Ivats Peak, Nordenskjöld Coast  
 Ivaylo Cove, Snow Island
 Izgrev Passage, Robert Island
 Mount Izvor, Oscar II Coast

See also 
 Bulgarian toponyms in Antarctica

External links 
 Bulgarian Antarctic Gazetteer
 SCAR Composite Gazetteer of Antarctica
 Antarctic Digital Database (ADD). Scale 1:250000 topographic map of Antarctica with place-name search.
 L. Ivanov. Bulgarian toponymic presence in Antarctica. Polar Week at the National Museum of Natural History in Sofia, 2–6 December 2019

Bibliography 
 J. Stewart. Antarctica: An Encyclopedia. Jefferson, N.C. and London: McFarland, 2011. 1771 pp.  
 L. Ivanov. Bulgarian Names in Antarctica. Sofia: Manfred Wörner Foundation, 2021. Second edition. 539 pp.  (in Bulgarian)
 G. Bakardzhieva. Bulgarian toponyms in Antarctica. Paisiy Hilendarski University of Plovdiv: Research Papers. Vol. 56, Book 1, Part A, 2018 – Languages and Literature, pp. 104-119 (in Bulgarian)
 L. Ivanov and N. Ivanova. Bulgarian names. In: The World of Antarctica. Generis Publishing, 2022. pp. 114-115. 

Antarctica
 
Bulgarian toponyms in Antarctica
Names of places in Antarctica